Events from the year 1989 in Canada.

Incumbents

Crown 
 Monarch – Elizabeth II

Federal government 
 Governor General – Jeanne Sauvé
 Prime Minister – Brian Mulroney
 Chief Justice – Brian Dickson (Manitoba)
 Parliament – 34th

Provincial governments

Lieutenant governors 
Lieutenant Governor of Alberta – Helen Hunley   
Lieutenant Governor of British Columbia – David Lam
Lieutenant Governor of Manitoba – George Johnson 
Lieutenant Governor of New Brunswick – Gilbert Finn 
Lieutenant Governor of Newfoundland – James McGrath 
Lieutenant Governor of Nova Scotia – Alan Abraham (until February 20) then Lloyd Crouse 
Lieutenant Governor of Ontario – Lincoln Alexander 
Lieutenant Governor of Prince Edward Island – Lloyd MacPhail 
Lieutenant Governor of Quebec – Gilles Lamontagne
Lieutenant Governor of Saskatchewan – Sylvia Fedoruk

Premiers 
Premier of Alberta – Don Getty  
Premier of British Columbia – Bill Vander Zalm 
Premier of Manitoba – Gary Filmon 
Premier of New Brunswick – Frank McKenna 
Premier of Newfoundland – Brian Peckford (until March 22) then Tom Rideout (March 22 to May 5) then Clyde Wells 
Premier of Nova Scotia – John Buchanan  
Premier of Ontario – David Peterson  
Premier of Prince Edward Island – Joe Ghiz 
Premier of Quebec – Robert Bourassa 
Premier of Saskatchewan – Grant Devine

Territorial governments

Commissioners 
 Commissioner of Yukon –  John Kenneth McKinnon 
 Commissioner of Northwest Territories – John Havelock Parker (until October 2) then Daniel L. Norris

Premiers 
Premier of the Northwest Territories – Dennis Patterson
Premier of Yukon – Tony Penikett

Events
January 1: The Canadian-American Free Trade Agreement comes into effect.
January 21: Newfoundland premier Brian Peckford announces his resignation from politics, giving the PC Party 2 months to find a replacement as party leader and premier.
January 30: Prime Minister Brian Mulroney shuffles his cabinet, appointing 6 new ministers and reassigning the responsibilities of 19 others.
February 10: President of the United States George H. W. Bush Prime Minister Mulroney in Ottawa, laying the groundwork for the Acid Rain Treaty of 1991.
February 20: In the Yukon Territory, the ruling New Democrats narrowly maintain control of the Yukon Legislative Assembly, winning 9 seats vs. the Progressive Conservative Party's 7.
March 1: The Canadian Space Agency is created.
March 10: An Air Ontario flight crashes near Dryden, Ontario, killing 24.
March 13: 2:44 AM ET: A solar coronal mass ejection causes a blackout across all of Quebec, as it hits the Hydro-Québec power grid, affecting 6 million people for more than 9 hours.
March 13: Deborah Grey wins a by-election to become the first Reform Party Member of Parliament.
March 19: LGBT activist Joe Rose is murdered on public transit in Montreal.
March 20: Alberta election: Don Getty's PCs win a sixth consecutive majority.
March 22: Thomas Rideout becomes premier of Newfoundland, replacing Brian Peckford.
April 20: The Liberal Party of Newfoundland, led by Clyde Wells, wins the Newfoundland general election.
May 3: John Turner resigns as leader of the Liberal Party of Canada.
May 5: Clyde Wells becomes premier of Newfoundland, defeating Thomas Rideout in a general election.
 May 25: The Calgary Flames defeat the Montreal Canadiens to win the 1989 Stanley Cup Finals.
May 29: The Liberal Party of Prince Edward Island, led by Joe Ghiz, remains in power following the Prince Edward Island general election.
June 3: The SkyDome (now known as Rogers Centre) is opened in Toronto.
June 5: The federal government announces sweeping cuts to Via Rail.
July 31: Cable television network CBC Newsworld is launched.
August 2: Minister of Consumer and Corporate Affairs Bernard Valcourt resigns after he is convicted of drunk driving.
September 1: French cable sports network, RDS, signs on.
September 25: In the Quebec general election, the Quebec Liberal Party, led by Robert Bourassa, is reelected with a large Liberal majority.
October 6: Prime Minister Mulroney nominates Ray Hnatyshyn to succeed Jeanne Sauvé as Governor General of Canada.
October 8: The Cormier Village hayride accident kills 13 people and injures 45.
 October 15 – Wayne Gretzky becomes the leading scorer in the history of the National Hockey League.
December 2: Audrey McLaughlin is elected head of the NDP replacing Ed Broadbent becoming the first female major party leader in Canadian history.
December 6: École Polytechnique massacre: Marc Lépine murders fourteen women at the École Polytechnique of the Université de Montréal in Montreal, Quebec. The event proves a spur to both the Canadian feminist and gun control movements.
December 21: Quebec uses the notwithstanding clause for the first time.
December 31: All rail service is terminated in Prince Edward Island after CN Rail abandons its historic rail lines in the province.

Full date unknown
Corel releases Corel Draw.
Heather Erxleben becomes Canada's first official female combat soldier.
Sidney Altman shares in the Nobel Prize for Chemistry.

Arts and literature

New works
Mordecai Richler: Solomon Gursky Was Here
Steve McCaffery: The Black Debt
Erín Moure: WSW
Joy Fielding: Good Intentions
Dave Duncan: West of January
Tomson Highway: Dry Lips Oughta Move to Kapuskasing
William Bell: Death Wind
Farley Mowat: The New Found Land

Awards
Books in Canada First Novel Award: Rick Salutin, A Man of Little Faith
See 1989 Governor General's Awards for a complete list of winners and finalists for those awards.
Geoffrey Bilson Award: Martyn Godfrey, Mystery in the Frozen Lands, and Dorothy Perkyns,  Rachel's Revolution
Gerald Lampert Award: Sarah Klassen, Journey to Yalta
Marian Engel Award: Merna Summers
Pat Lowther Award: Heather Spears, The Word for Sand
Stephen Leacock Award: John Kertes, Winter Tulips
Trillium Book Award: Modris Eksteins, Rites of Spring
Vicky Metcalf Award: Stéphane Poulin

Music
Simply Saucer, Cyborgs Revisited
Tragically Hip – Up to Here

Sport
May 13 – Swift Current Broncos win their only Memorial Cup by defeating the Saskatoon Blades 4 to 3. The final game was played at Saskatchewan Place in Saskatoon, Saskatchewan
May 25 – Calgary Flames win their only Stanley Cup by defeating the Montreal Canadiens  4 games to 2. The deciding Game 6 is played at the Montreal Forum. Inverness, Nova Scotia's Al MacInnis is awarded the Conn Smythe Trophy
June 5 – Toronto Blue Jays lose the first baseball game played at the SkyDome to the Milwaukee Brewers 3 to 5.
November 18 – Western Ontario Mustangs win their fifth Vanier Cup by defeating the Saskatchewan Huskies 35 to 10 in the 25th Grey Cup played at the SkyDome in Toronto.
November 26 – Saskatchewan Roughriders win their second (and first since 1966) Grey Cup by defeating the Hamilton Tiger-Cats 43 to 40 in the 77th Grey Cup played at the SkyDome in Toronto.

Births
January 9 – Nina Dobrev, actress
January 14 – Karine Thomas, synchronized swimmer
February 11 – Jesse Rath, actor
February 13 – Carly McKillip, actress
February 14 – Emma Miskew, curler
February 20 – Melanie Leishman, actress
March 3 – Andrea Brooks, actress
March 19 – Stephanie Horner, swimmer
April 13 – Mallory Deluce, ice hockey player
April 19 – Simu Liu, actor
April 25 – Marie-Michèle Gagnon, skier
April 28 – Steffi DiDomenicantonio, singer
May 11 – Alyssa Brown, artistic gymnast
May 17 – Tessa Virtue, ice dancer
May 23 – Grace Mahary, model
June 11 – Keith Aulie, ice hockey player
June 17 – Brandon Jones, singer
July 27 – Charlotte Arnold, actress
July 31 – Marshall Williams, actor
August 2 – Dominic Jalbert, ice hockey player
September 12 – Elyse Hopfner-Hibbs, artistic gymnast
September 23 – Craig Sharpe, singer
September 25 – Jordan Gavaris, actor
October 20 – Colin Wilson, Canadian-American ice hockey player
October 24 – Shenae Grimes, actress
November 5 – Joey Lawrence, photographer
November 24 – Nicole Sassine, sprinter
December 2 – Cassie Steele, actress and singer-songwriter

Deaths

January to June
January 20 – Beatrice Lillie, comic actress (b. 1894)
January 22 – Farquhar Oliver, politician (b. 1904)
January 31 – William Stephenson, soldier, airman, businessperson, inventor and spymaster (b. 1897)
February 9 – Ken Adachi, writer and literary critic (b. 1929)
May 14 – Joe Primeau, ice hockey player (b. 1906)
May 14 – E. P. Taylor, business tycoon and race horse breeder (b. 1901)
June 14 – Louis-Philippe-Antoine Bélanger, politician (b. 1907)
June 26 – Howard Charles Green, politician and Minister (b. 1895)

July to December
July 3 – Peter Fox, politician (b. 1921)
July 13 – Samuel Boulanger, politician (b. 1909)
July 24 – Michael Estok, poet
August 10 – George Ignatieff, diplomat (b. 1913)
November 11 – Kenneth MacLean Glazier, Sr., minister and librarian (b. 1912)
September 12 – Elyse Hopfner-Hibbs, gymnast
November 13 – Victor Davis, swimmer, Olympic gold medalist and World Champion (b. 1964)
November 15 – George Manuel, Aboriginal leader (b. 1921)
November 29 – Nancy Bell, senator (b. 1924)
December 6 – Marc Lépine, murderer responsible for the École Polytechnique massacre (b. 1964)
December 26 – Doug Harvey, ice hockey player (b. 1924)
December 26 – Maryon Pearson, wife of Lester B. Pearson, 14th Prime Minister of Canada (b. 1901)

See also
 1989 in Canadian television
 List of Canadian films of 1989

References 

 
Years of the 20th century in Canada
Canada
1989 in North America